Presidential elections were held in Algeria on 12 January 1984. Incumbent Chadli Bendjedid, leader of the National Liberation Front (the country's sole legal political party), was re-elected unopposed with 99.42% of the vote, based on a 96% voter turnout.

Results

References

Algeria
1984 in Algeria
Presidential elections in Algeria
One-party elections
Single-candidate elections